"Into the Fire" was the second single from Sarah McLachlan's album Solace.  It was written by McLachlan and her producer Pierre Marchand.

Music video

The music video was one of the rare instances to portray full nudity: the first half showed McLachlan lying in a wooded field, completely naked and covered from head to toe in mud, before walking underneath a waterfall, washing the mud off, and proceeding to sing by it dry and fully clothed in the second half. Interspersed throughout were shots of a young girl running through the woods in slow-motion.

Track listing

7": Arista / 115 266 (Germany, UK) 

 "Into the Fire (Album version)"
 "Into the Fire (John Fryer Mix)"

CD: Nettwerk / W2-3063 (Canada) 

 "Into the Fire"
 "Sad Clown (CBC version)"
 "Black (CBC version)"

 Also released on cassette 4JW-3063

CD: Arista / ASCD-2390 (US) 

 "Into the Fire (John Fryer Mix)" (3:32)
 "Into the Fire (Album Version)" (3:29)

 US promo release

12": ADP-2402 (US) 

 "Into the Fire (extended remix)"
 "Into the Fire (dub)"
 "Into the Fire (John Fryer mix)"

 US promo release

CD: Arista / ASCD-2402 (US) 

 "Into the Fire (extended remix)"
 "Into the Fire (dub)"
 "Into the Fire (John Fryer mix)"
 "Into the Fire (Album version)"

 US promo release

Charts

References

External links

1991 songs
1992 singles
Sarah McLachlan songs
Arista Records singles
Nettwerk Records singles
Songs written by Sarah McLachlan
Songs written by Pierre Marchand
Juno Award for Video of the Year videos